The 1948 BAA Finals was the championship round of the Basketball Association of America's 1947–48 season. The Philadelphia Warriors of the Eastern Division faced the Baltimore Bullets of the Western Division, with Philadelphia having home court advantage.

Baltimore was not the Western Division champion but advanced to the championship round by winning a four-team playoff among the Eastern and Western Division runners-up. Meanwhile, the Eastern and Western Division champions, Philadelphia Warriors and St. Louis Bombers, played one long series to determine the other finalist, a best-of-seven series that Philadelphia won 4–3. In the runners-up bracket, Baltimore and Chicago from the West had first eliminated New York and Boston from the East, then faced each other in a best-of-three series. The format was used only twice, in 1947 and 1948, and generated two champions from the runners-up bracket.

The six games of the final series were played in twelve days, with at least one day off except prior to the decisive game. Division champions Philadelphia and St. Louis had played the seven games of their semifinal series in fifteen days, March 23 to April 6, with at least one day off before every game. The entire playoff tournament extended 30 days.

As of 2022, this is the only BAA/NBA Finals which a now-defunct team won (as opposed to teams that changed names and/or moved to other cities in later years).

Series summary

Bullets win series 4–2

Team rosters

Baltimore Bullets

Philadelphia Warriors

References

External links
 1948 Finals at NBA.com
 1948 BAA Playoffs at Basketball-Reference.com

Finals
Baltimore Bullets (1944–1954)
Philadelphia Warriors games
Basketball Association of America Finals
1948 in sports in Maryland
1948 in sports in Pennsylvania
BAA Finals, 1948
BAA Finals, 1948
April 1948 sports events in the United States
Basketball competitions in Baltimore
Basketball competitions in Philadelphia